Valdo Gonçalves Alhinho (born 17 December 1988) is an Angolan professional footballer who plays for Hamrun Spartans mainly as a midfielder.

Club career 
Born in Benguela, Alhinho made his debut with Sacavenense in 2007 of the fifth tier, moving to Murça in the same tier in following year. After failing to make an impact he signed for Maltese club Sliema Wanderers in 2010.

After making 3 appearances, he joined Msida  of the second tier, and after a short stint with St. Andrews, he returned to top tier with Floriana in 2012. The following year he played for Recreativo Caála of his country.

Alhinho signed for Segunda Liga newly promoted club Oriental at the beginning of the 2014–15 season for a two-year contract.

References

External links 
 
 

1988 births
Living people
Association football midfielders
Angolan footballers
Angolan expatriate footballers
Sliema Wanderers F.C. players
Msida Saint-Joseph F.C. players
Floriana F.C. players
St. Andrews F.C. players
C.R. Caála players
Clube Oriental de Lisboa players
Valletta F.C. players
FK Jelgava players
AD Fafe players
F.C. Alverca players
Ħamrun Spartans F.C. players
Liga Portugal 2 players
Al Batin FC players
Maltese Premier League players
Segunda Divisão players
Saudi Professional League players
Angolan expatriate sportspeople in Portugal
Expatriate footballers in Malta
Expatriate footballers in Portugal
Expatriate footballers in Latvia
Expatriate footballers in Saudi Arabia
People from Benguela